Heini Otto (born 24 August 1954) is a Dutch former professional footballer who played as an attacking midfielder.

Club career

Early career
Otto worked for his father-in-law in the gold business, and then in a whisky distillery before becoming a professional footballer. He began his career playing for FC Amsterdam between 1974 and 1977, followed by a move to FC Twente until 1980, where he had replaced Arnold Mühren after he left for Ipswich Town.

Middlesbrough
In the summer of 1981, Otto played three friendly games for English side Middlesbrough, with a view to a permanent transfer. He impressed manager Bobby Murdoch and signed a two-year contract in August. He made a scoring debut in the Football League, against Tottenham Hotspur at Ayresome Park, but the team lost 3–1. Otto was joint top scorer with a meagre five goals when Middlesbrough dropped into the Second Division in 1982. He stayed at the club for the next few seasons.

Otto was ever-present for Middlesbrough between 1982 and 1985 earning 155 consecutive appearances (the fourth longest period in the club's history), but eventually rejected a contract extension in May 1985 and returned to the Netherlands the following month to play for FC Den Haag. He is revered by fans of Middlesbrough who watched him play during this otherwise bleak period in the club's fortunes.

Amongst Middlesbrough fans of the period Heine Otto is recognised as an all-time great in the history of the club.

Late career
Otto spent seven seasons playing for Den Haag, being ever present in the side from 18 August 1985 until and 3 November 1991. Later this record was only broken by Fred Grim. In his last season (1991–1992) Heini Otto became the one and only player ever in the Dutch "Eredivisie", that's the highest league in Holland, to score two own goals in one game. This happens in the away game against Feyenoord in "De Kuip", he did it once in each half. As a player, he retired in 1992, later on he became a football coach.

International career
Otto played several times for the Netherlands Under-23 side, earning one cap for the full national side. His solitary cap came in a very unusual way. He gave his teammate Jan Jongbloed a ride to Amsterdam Schiphol Airport, for a match against Yugoslavia on 30 May 1975. At the airport, manager George Knobel noticed that Willem van Hanegem had not showed up so he asked Otto to go home as fast as he could to get his football belongings and return to the airport. At 71 minutes into the match, Otto replaced Peter Arntz and played his first and only match for the national team. Five years later he was included in the UEFA Euro 1980 squad but did not feature.

Coaching career
For the first two years of his coaching career, Otto was a coach and executive at Den Haag, before moving to Ajax Amsterdam. He would coach there for the next three years before becoming assistant manager for a further three. On 1 November 2000 Otto was appointed manager of HFC Haarlem. He held the role until 5 December 2002. He later returned to Ajax as a youth coach.

References

1954 births
ADO Den Haag players
Dutch footballers
Dutch expatriate footballers
Dutch football managers
Eredivisie players
FC Amsterdam players
FC Twente players
Living people
Middlesbrough F.C. players
English Football League players
Netherlands international footballers
Footballers from Amsterdam
UEFA Euro 1980 players
Association football midfielders
AFC Ajax non-playing staff
HFC Haarlem managers
Expatriate footballers in England
Dutch expatriate sportspeople in England